Paolo Valagussa (born 16 May 1993) is an Italian footballer who plays as a midfielder for Caratese.

Club career
On 24 October 2018 he joined Serie D club Rezzato.

On 29 August 2019 he signed with Arzignano. His contract with Arzignano was dissolved by mutual consent on 21 January 2020.

References

1993 births
Footballers from Milan
Living people
Italian footballers
A.C. Monza players
Virtus Entella players
A.S. Gubbio 1910 players
U.S. Viterbese 1908 players
U.S. Folgore Caratese A.S.D. players
Serie B players
Serie C players
Serie D players
Association football midfielders